The Lee Flames are the athletic teams that represent Lee University, located in Cleveland, Tennessee, in intercollegiate sports at the Division II level of the National Collegiate Athletic Association (NCAA). The Chargers have primarily competed in the Gulf South Conference since the 2013–14 academic year.

Lee competes in twenty intercollegiate varsity sports. Men's sports include baseball, basketball, cheerleading, cross country, golf, soccer, tennis, and track and field (indoor and outdoor); while women's sports include basketball, cheerleading, cross country, golf, lacrosse, soccer, softball, tennis, track and field (indoor and outdoor), and volleyball.

Conference affiliations 
NAIA
 Southern States Athletic Conference (2004–2013)

NCAA
 Gulf South Conference (2013–present)

The Flames were also members of the National Christian College Athletic Association (NCCAA), primarily competing as an independent in the Mid-East Region of the Division I level.

Varsity teams 

Club sports are offered such as boxing, men's and women's rugby, spikeball and ultimate frisbee.

Men's cross country
Lee's men's cross country team won at an NCCAA national title in 2014. The program won four GSC titles in a row (2015, 2016, 2017, and 2018), as well as back to back South Region titles in 2016 and 2017. The Men's XC team has finished as high as 18th in a national championship in 2016.

Women's cross country
Lee's women's cross country team won three GSC Championships in a row (2017, 2018, and 2019), as well as a South Region title in 2019. The Lady Flames have finished as high as 14th in a national championship in 2019.

Soccer
Lee's Lady Flames soccer team won the NAIA National Championship in 2008 2009, 2010, and 2011. Lee's Lady Flames and men's soccer team both won the NCCAA National Championship in 2014.

Notable alumni

Women's soccer 
 Ode Fulutudilu

References

External links